Italy competed at the 2002 European Athletics Championships in Munich, Germany, from 6 to 11 August 2002.

Medalists

See also
 Italy national athletics team

References

External links
 EAA official site 

 

Italy at the European Athletics Championships
Nations at the 2002 European Athletics Championships
2002 in Italian sport